Donald Correia (born August 28, 1951) is an American dancer, actor and choreographer of American stage, film and television. He has been married to actress Sandy Duncan since July 21, 1980. He was nominated in 1986 for the Tony Award for Best Actor (Musical) for Singin' in the Rain.

Biography

Correia was born in San Jose, California, on August 8, 1951. Correia has worked in theater, film and television as an actor, dancer, singer and choreographer since 1976.

In 1983 he played Vernon Castle on TV Parade of Stars, teaming with his wife Sandy Duncan who played Irene Castle.

He also served as the choreographer for the 1988 film My Stepmother Is an Alien, starring Kim Basinger. He also appeared in a cameo role in the reception scene in the Woody Allen film Everyone Says I Love You.

On Broadway, he starred in several musicals, including the 1986 critically acclaimed stage version of Singin' In The Rain playing the part of Don Lockwood. Directed and choreographed by Twyla Tharp, Don Correia was nominated for a Tony Award in 1986 for Best Actor in a Musical.

Personal life
Correia has been married to actress and producer Sandy Duncan since July 21, 1980, They have two sons, Jeffrey (born October 5, 1982) and Michael (born March 19. 1984). Both Jeffrey and Michael appeared with their mother in her now famous Wheat Thins commercial campaign of the late 1970s and 1980s. Correia and Duncan reside in Connecticut.

Broadway Productions
 A Chorus Line (Broadway, July 25, 1975)
 Perfectly Frank (Broadway, November 30, 1980)
 Sophisticated Ladies (Broadway, March 1, 1981)
 Little Me (Broadway, January 21, 1982)
 My One And Only (Broadway, May 1, 1983)
 Singin 'in the Rain (Broadway, July 2, 1985)  (Tony Nomination, Best Actor) (Musical))
 Follies (Broadway, April 5, 2001)
 Follies (Broadway, September 12, 2011)

Filmography
 Pinocchio, directed by Ron Field and Sid Smith (1976)
 Television Parade of Stars, directed by Clark Jones (1983) 
 Once Upon a Brothers Grimm, directed by Norman Campbell (1976)
 Everyone Says I Love You, (cameo appearance) directed by Woody Allen (1996)

References

External links

 
 

1951 births
Living people
American male musical theatre actors
Male actors from San Jose, California